Glaucium oxylobum, called Lotus sweetjuice, is a species of flowering plant in the horned poppy genus which is native to Afghanistan, Iran, Turkmenistan, and Uzbekistan. It was originally described by Pierre Edmond Boissier and Friedrich Alexander Buhse in 1860 in the 12th volume of the Nouveaux mémoires de la Société impériale des naturalistes de Moscou.

References 

Papaveroideae
Flora of Afghanistan
Flora of Iran
Flora of Turkmenistan
Flora of Uzbekistan
Taxa named by Friedrich Alexander Buhse